The Honda CB500 Four is a standard , air-cooled, 8-valve, SOHC, transverse inline-four motorcycle made by Honda from 1971 to 1978. It was introduced at the London Racing and Sporting Motorcycle Show in February 1972, and sold in the US market until 1973, replaced by the CB550 in the 1974 model year, while continuing in the European market until 1978.

Like the earlier CB750, it has a single front hydraulic disc brake, rear drum brake, electric starter, and SOHC eight-valve engine. The four-into-four exhaust pipes echoed those of the CB750. Unlike the earlier dry sump CB750, the smaller bike has a wet sump engine. Also, the primary drives were different, the CB750 having a duplex chain, while the CB500 had a "Hy-Vo" Morse chain.

Reviewing the 1972 show models, UK monthly magazine Motorcycle Mechanics described the CB500 as "one of the 'show stealers'. Four cylinders, in-line across the frame, four carburettors and single overhead camshaft motor, coupled to a five-speed gearbox give this 500 cc machine the performance of a 650 twin cylinder bike."

Several CB500 machines were entered in the Production TT races on the Isle of Man in the early 1970s. Bill Smith won the 1973 500 cc TT Production race (four laps) riding one, 8.2 seconds ahead of second place Stan Woods mounted on a Suzuki T500 two-stroke, twin.

References

CB500
Standard motorcycles